Batman is a 1943 American 15-chapter theatrical serial from Columbia Pictures, produced by Rudolph C. Flothow, directed by Lambert Hillyer, that stars Lewis Wilson as Batman and Douglas Croft as his sidekick Robin. The serial is based on the DC Comics character Batman, who first appeared in Detective Comics #27 in May 1939. The villain is an original character named Dr. Daka, a secret agent of the Japanese Imperial government, played by J. Carrol Naish. Rounding out the cast are Shirley Patterson as Linda Page, Bruce Wayne's love interest, and William Austin as Alfred, the Wayne Manor butler.

The serial's story line involves the Batman, a secret U.S. government agent, attempting to defeat the schemes of Japanese agent Dr. Daka operating in Los Angeles at the height of World War II. Serving Daka are his American henchmen.

Batman is notable for being the first appearance on film of Batman and for debuting story elements that quickly became permanent parts of the Batman character's mythos, such as the "Bat's Cave" and its secret entrance through a grandfather clock inside Wayne Manor. The serial also changed the course of how Alfred's physical appearance was depicted in future Batman stories. At the time Batman was released in theaters, Alfred was drawn as a portly gentleman in the comics. Subsequent issues suddenly depicted Alfred as slim and sporting a thin moustache, following actor William Austin's appearance.

The serial was commercially successful and in 1949, four years after World War II, spawned another Columbia chapter serial, Batman and Robin. The entire first Batman serial was re-released theatrically in 1965 as An Evening with Batman and Robin, and proved very popular (some theatres showed the chapters as a Saturday matinee). Its success inspired the action-comedy lampoon series Batman (and its 1966 theatrical feature film spin-off) starring Adam West and Burt Ward.

Plot
The Batman/Bruce Wayne (Lewis Wilson), and his ward, Robin/Dick Grayson (Douglas Croft), secret government agents following the Japanese attack on Pearl Harbor, become aware of a Japanese sabotage ring operating in Gotham City. Bruce's girlfriend Linda Page (Shirley Patterson) asks for his help in finding her uncle, Martin Warren (Gus Glassmire), who was abducted by the ring after he was released from prison.

Dr. Tito Daka (J. Carrol Naish), the Japanese leader of the ring, plans to steal the city's radium supply to power his invention, a hand-held ray gun that can dissolve anything hit by its powerful beam. He forces from Warren the location of the vault where the radium is stored. Daka sends his American henchmen, along with a zombie that he controls by microphone via an electronic brain implant, to steal the precious metal. Batman discovers the plot and eventually routs the gang after a terrific battle.

In his secret Bat's Cave, the Batman interrogates one of Daka's henchmen, who reveals the radium was to have been taken to The House of the Open Door, located in the mostly deserted "Little Tokyo" section of Gotham City. Batman and Robin infiltrate the gang's lair (also Dr. Daka's laboratory), hidden inside a still-open business, a Fun House ride. There, they find Linda bound, gagged, and unconscious. After she is rescued by the Dynamic Duo, Daka transforms her uncle Warren into a zombie, and plots the derailment of a heavily laden supply train. Once again, Dr. Daka's sabotage efforts are stopped by the Batman and Robin.

Traps and counter-traps follow in the succeeding chapters, as the Dynamic Duo continue to thwart the plans of the Japanese agent and his henchmen. When Dr. Daka attempts to steal America's Victory Plans, the Batman and Robin finally prevail. They oversee the capture of Daka's men and finally the death of the Japanese agent, as he tries to escape and falls through his own hidden trapdoor into a pit full of hungry alligators.

Chapter titles

Source:

Cast
 Lewis Wilson as Bruce Wayne / Batman
 Douglas Croft as Richard "Dick" Grayson / Robin
 J. Carrol Naish as Dr. Tito Daka/Prince Daka
 Shirley Patterson as Linda Page
 William Austin as Alfred (uncredited)
 Robert Fiske as Foster (uncredited)
 Gus Glassmire as Uncle Martin (uncredited)
 Karl Hackett as Wallace (uncredited)
 Tom London as Andrews (uncredited) 
 Charles Middleton as Ken Colton (Episodes #6-#8) (uncredited)
 Harry Tenbrook as Bartender (uncredited)
 Charles C. Wilson as Police Captain Arnold (uncredited)

Production
The serial was made at the height of World War II and, like numerous works of popular American fiction of the time, contains anti-Axis powers sentiments and dialogue reflecting anti-Japanese sentiment. In a scene one of Daka's henchmen turns on him, saying, "That's the kind of answer that fits the color of your skin". Early narration in the first chapter (at minute 9:20-9:30) references the U.S. government policy of Japanese American internment to explain the abandoned neighborhood where Daka's headquarters are located: "This was part of a foreign land, transplanted bodily to America and known as Little Tokyo. Since a wise government rounded up the shifty-eyed Japs, it has become virtually a ghost street."

Just like many other contemporary serials, Batman also suffered from a low budget. No attempt was made to create the Batmobile, so a black 1939 Cadillac Series 61 convertible was used, chauffeured by Alfred when Bruce Wayne and Dick Grayson were either in their civilian or Batman and Robin identities. It is driven "top-up" when it is the Batmobile, and "top-down" when it is Bruce Wayne's car. Batman's hometown of Gotham City, an analog of New York in the comics, becomes an analog of Los Angeles in the movie.

While many serials made changes as part of their adaptation, to the extent that they were "often 'improved' almost out of recognition", Batman "fared better than most and changes were minor". In this serial special utility belts were worn but never used, the villain was not taken from the comics' stories, there was no Batmobile, and Batman was a secret government agent instead of an independent crime-fighting vigilante. This last change was due to the time period's film censors, who would not allow the hero to be seen taking the law into his own hands.

Several continuity errors occur, such as Batman losing his cape in a fight but wearing it again after the film only briefly cuts away. The opening narration in chapter 1 states that Wayne Manor is in the fictional Gotham City, but his mail in chapter 5 is addressed to Los Angeles. In the first chapter, Batman, when hearing the name of Dr. Daka asks "who is that?" Then in the last chapter Batman tells Daka he and other enforcers have been looking for Daka since he killed two agents trying to deport him—an element never mentioned in any earlier chapter. In the transition between chapters 5 and 6, it is unclear how Batman survived the plane crash which killed two villains who were on the plane with him.

Press releases announced Batman as a "Super Serial", and it was Columbia's largest-scale serial production to date. The studio gave it a publicity campaign equivalent to a feature film.

Comic book trivia
Bruce Wayne, Dick Grayson, Alfred, and Linda Page are the only characters from the comic books to appear in the serial. Alfred may have been created for the film and "previewed" by the comics (see above).

Captain Arnold is essentially the same character as Commissioner Gordon, who was already a fixture in the comics since Batman's debut appearance; the reason for this change is unknown.

Release

Theatrical release
Batman was first released to theaters one chapter per week, beginning on July 16, 1943. Columbia re-released it to theaters in 1954 and 1962.

In 1964, film buff Hugh Hefner screened all 15 chapters of the serial at the Playboy Mansion. The trendy event received much notice in the press, prompting Columbia to offer the unedited serial to theaters in 1965 as An Evening with Batman and Robin in one long, marathon showing. This re-release was successful enough to inspire the development, by Lorenzo Semple, Jr., under the auspices of producers William Dozier and Howie Horwitz), of the 1960s television series Batman. The series starred Adam West and Burt Ward as Batman and Robin, the Boy Wonder, and was produced as a lampoon, being villain-driven and heavy on the action-comedy.

Home media
The serial was released as a two-part VHS series in the late 1980s by GoodTimes Entertainment in a heavily modified form that dubbed over most of the original dialogue of a racially sensitive nature. Dan Scapperotti of Cinefantastique commented: "The revisions aren't surprising when you consider that Columbia is now owned by Japan's Sony Corporation. It appears that some of Daka's operatives escaped Batman's justice and were rewarded with positions at the new George Orwell department at Columbia. No doubt we can expect to see David Lean's Bridge on the River Kwai reissued as the story of a joyous Anglo-Japanese cooperative construction job interrupted by imperialistic American terrorists." Alterations made by Sony were limited to the soundtrack itself, and no frames or scenes were cut. Gary Owens provided a new narration track, while additional lines of a racially sensitive nature were replaced by voice actors bearing little similarity to the original voices.

In October 2005, Sony Pictures Home Entertainment unveiled a two-disc DVD of the serial. This release restored the original dialogue but is missing several seconds in Chapter 2, such as the "Next Chapter" sequence at the end. The image and sound quality of Sony's set varies; the first episode is an upscale of the previous VHS transfer, but the remainder of the episodes were restored.

On February 4, 2014, Mill Creek Entertainment released Gotham City Serials, a two-disc DVD set with both the 1943 serial and the 1949 Batman and Robin serial.

A silent abridged version was released in 8 mm and Super 8 formats during the 1960s, with the complete serial edited into six chapters running 10 minutes each. Several three-minute reels titled with action scenes were also issued.

In the 1970s, the complete 15-chapter serial in its original unaltered format was released in a Super-8 Sound edition.

Television
In 1989, the cable network The Comedy Channel aired the Batman serial uncut and uncensored. The cable network American Movie Classics did the same in the early 1990s on Saturday mornings. Turner Classic Movies began airing the serial every Saturday morning beginning in March 2015. Following the conclusion of the last episode, the channel continued the weekly slot with the 1949 Batman and Robin follow-up serial that, following an August hiatus, concluded in November 2015. In June 2021, Turner Classic Movies started airing Batman with one chapter every Saturday morning.

Critical reception
Author Raymond Williams Stedman notes that the serial "gained good press notices" but "scarcely deserves them," going on to describe it as an "unintentional farce." Jim Harmon and Donald F. Glut describe Batman as "one of the most ludicrous serials ever made" despite its "forthright simplicity."

The casting of Lewis Wilson as Batman and Douglas Croft as Robin has been criticized. Some critics felt that the actors and their stunt doubles lacked the "style and grace" of their comic-book characters. While Wilson's face resembled that of Bruce Wayne and he played his part with sincerity, critics found his physique to be unathletic and "thick about the middle", and his voice was both too high-pitched and had a Boston accent. Croft was considered too old to play Robin and looked older still when doubled by a "hairy-legged" stuntman.

Also, the costumes are considered to be unconvincing in execution, and although the Batman costume was based on his original appearance, it draws special criticism for being too baggy and "topped by pair of devils horns".

Will Brooker remarks in Batman Unmasked: Analyzing a Cultural Icon that, although he feels that the depiction of the Japanese characters is racist, Batman has little direct contact with them. However, when Batman does in fact finally meet Daka in the final chapter, he immediately exclaims "Oh, a Jap!" He soon after calls Daka "Jap murderer" and "Jap devil" and finally discusses a "Jap spy ring". Brooker surmises that these elements are likely to have been added as an afterthought to make the film more appealing to audiences of the time and that creating a nationalistic, patriotic film was not the filmmakers' original intent.

Influence
An Evening with Batman and Robin was especially popular in college towns, where theaters were booked solid. The success of this re-release led to the creation of the TV series Batman. The breathless opening and closing narration of each chapter in this and other Columbia serials was, to some extent, the model that was parodied in the mid-1960s series.

The success of both the re-release and the subsequent TV series prompted the production of The Green Hornet. Originally a radio action crime drama series from 1936 to 1953, it was also the basis of two Universal Pictures movie serials in 1940. The 1966-67 TV show was played as a straight superhero action mystery series, "in the tradition of its former presentations," and was also very popular with audiences but lasted only one season, owing to significantly higher production costs. The failure of The Green Hornet led to the belief that similar revivals of serial properties were not possible in the television market of the time, and no further series were produced.

At DC Comics, Prince Daka appeared in All-Star Squadron #42-43 (February–March 1985) as the leader of several Japanese super-operatives. Since the #42-43 storyline occurred in 1942, it depicts Daka's activities prior to the events of the 1943 serial, as noted by writer Roy Thomas in a letter column.

From 2016 to 2019, Big John Creations produced a web series called Mystery of the Bat-Man as an homage to the original serial. Six chapters have been released under the guise of a "lost" serial from the late 1930s, complete with fictional backstory.

References

External links
 
 
 
 
 Serials @ Batman: Yesterday, Today, & Beyond
 "BATMAN ON FILM" – The 40s Serials

1943 films
1940s action films
1940s superhero films
Live-action films based on DC Comics
Batman films
American World War II propaganda films
Columbia Pictures film serials
American black-and-white films
Films directed by Lambert Hillyer
American action films
Films with screenplays by Harry L. Fraser
Japan in non-Japanese culture
1940s English-language films
Films based on DC Comics